Petri Pasanen (born 24 September 1980) is a Finnish former professional footballer who played as a defender. He was most comfortable as centre-back, but also played right-back and left-back as well. Pasanen began his senior career in his native Finland before moving to Ajax. He spent most of his career at Bundesliga club Werder Bremen which he represented in the UEFA Champions League in multiple seasons, and in the 2009 UEFA Cup Final.

Club career

FC Lahti
Born in Lahti, Finland, Pasanen became a regular for local club FC Lahti during the club's promotion season in 1998. During the next two seasons he made 42 appearances for the club in Finland's Veikkausliiga.

Ajax
Many of Europe's top clubs had become interested in the promising Pasanen, and in the summer of 2000 he joined Dutch club Ajax. He became a regular in the Ajax defense in his first season, but his progress was halted when he broke his foot in August 2001, and had to miss most of the 2001–02 season. Next season he was a regular again as Ajax reached the quarter-finals of the UEFA Champions League.

He fell out of favour at Ajax in 2003–04, and spent the second half of the season on loan at English club Portsmouth in the Premier League. Portsmouth manager Harry Redknapp was interested in purchasing Pasanen at the end of the season, but claimed Ajax's asking price was too high.

Werder Bremen
Pasanen was then signed by reigning German champions Werder Bremen in the summer of 2004. He became a key player for the club, helping them to a top three finish in the Bundesliga and the second round of the Champions League in each of his first two seasons at the club. Whilst at Bremen he played in the 2009 UEFA Cup Final.

Red Bull Salzburg
On 30 June 2011, after the end of his contract, he left Werder Bremen, and signed for Red Bull Salzburg. On 12 May 2012, Salzburg announced that they would not renew Pasanen's contract and he would be free to look for a new club during the summer.

AGF Aarhus
On 28 July 2012, Pasanen signed a two-year contract with Danish topflight side AGF. He scored his first goal for AGF on 10 December 2012, in a 3−3 home draw against Silkeborg.

Return to Lahti
In May 2014, FC Lahti announced that Pasanen would return to Lahti and that he had signed a contract until the end of the 2016 season. On 29 September 2015, Pasanen announced that he would retire from professional football at the end of the season.

International career
Pasanen was also a regular for the Finland national team. He made his international debut on 15 November 2000 against the Republic of Ireland. Pasanen has mostly played at right back for Finland, and has also served as the national team's captain, when Sami Hyypiä and Jari Litmanen have not played. He scored his only goal on 22 May 2002 in a home friendly at the Helsinki Olympic Stadium against Latvia, which Finland won 2–1.

Pasanen has also played in Finland national futsal team, where he has six caps and two goals.

Career statistics

Club

International

Scores and results list Finland's goal tally first, score column indicates score after Pasanen goal.

Honours
Ajax
Eredivisie: 2001–02
KNVB Cup: 2001–02
Johan Cruijff Shield: 2002

Werder Bremen
DFB Ligapokal: 2006
DFB-Pokal: 2008–09
 UEFA Cup Runner-up: 2008–09

Red Bull Salzburg
 Austrian Bundesliga: 2011–12
 Austrian Cup: 2011–12

Individual
2008: Finnish Sports Journalists footballer of the year

References

External links
 
 
 
 
 

1980 births
Living people
Sportspeople from Lahti
Finnish footballers
Association football central defenders
Association football fullbacks
FC Lahti players
FC Hämeenlinna players
AFC Ajax players
Portsmouth F.C. players
SV Werder Bremen players
FC Red Bull Salzburg players
Aarhus Gymnastikforening players
Veikkausliiga players
Eredivisie players
Premier League players
Bundesliga players
Austrian Football Bundesliga players
Danish Superliga players
Finland international footballers
Finnish expatriate footballers
Finnish expatriate sportspeople in the Netherlands
Expatriate footballers in the Netherlands
Expatriate footballers in England
Expatriate footballers in Austria
Finnish expatriate sportspeople in Germany
Expatriate footballers in Germany
Expatriate men's footballers in Denmark